Almost Salinas is a 2001 American mystery comedy-drama film written and directed by Terry Green and starring John Mahoney, Linda Emond, Lindsay Crouse and Virginia Madsen.

Cast
John Mahoney as Max Harris
Linda Emond as Nina Ellington
Lindsay Crouse as Allie
Virginia Madsen as Clare
Ian Gomez as Manny
Nathan Davis as Zelder Hill
Tom Groenwald as Leo Quinlan
Ray Wise as Jack Tynan
Amanda Pitera as Billie
Glenn Dunk as Jason
Lucy Reeves as Moira
Adrian Neil as Dante
Eric Wrye as Buz

Reception
The film has a 20% rating on Rotten Tomatoes.  Roger Ebert awarded the film one and a half stars.  Robert K. Elder of the Chicago Tribune gave it two and a half stars.

References

External links
 
 

2000s mystery comedy-drama films
American mystery comedy-drama films
2000s English-language films
2000s American films